Tagazar is a village and rural commune in Niger.

References

Communes of Niger